The Barton Bulldogs football team represents Barton College in college football at the NCAA Division II level. Barton is a member of the South Atlantic Conference (SAC). The Bulldogs play their home games at Truist Stadium in Wilson, North Carolina. The team's head coach is Chip Hester, who took over the position in 2019.

Year-by-year results

References

 
American football teams established in 1920
1920 establishments in North Carolina